Norman Theuerkauf (born 24 January 1987) is a German footballer who plays for 1. FC Heidenheim.

Career
Theuerkauf started his career with the reserve sides of SV Werder Bremen and Eintracht Frankfurt, before joining Eintracht Braunschweig in the 3. Liga. As one of the club's regular starters he contributed to Eintracht Braunschweig's promotion back to the 2. Bundesliga in 2011, and to the Bundesliga in 2013. After the 2014–15 2. Bundesliga season, Theuerkauf joined 1. FC Heidenheim on a free transfer.

References

External links

1987 births
Living people
People from Nordhausen, Thuringia
Footballers from Thuringia
German footballers
Association football midfielders
Association football defenders
Germany youth international footballers
Eintracht Braunschweig players
Eintracht Braunschweig II players
Eintracht Frankfurt II players
SV Werder Bremen II players
1. FC Heidenheim players
Bundesliga players
2. Bundesliga players
3. Liga players